The women's 4 × 400 metres relay event at the 2020 Summer Olympics took place on 5 and 7 August 2021 at the Japan National Stadium. There were 16 competing relay teams, with each team having 5 members from which 4 were selected in each round.

Summary
This was the first year a team could run eight runners in the semis and finals.  Essentially a deep team could run fresh runners in the semi and final.  USA took advantage, doing exactly that, running the #3 through 6 finishers in the US Olympic Trials 400 m in the semi final round.  Kaylin Whitney, Wadeline Jonathas, Kendall Ellis and Lynna Irby combined to produce the fastest time in the semi final round, more than a second faster than Jamaica, who also held two runners in reserve.  Great Britain was the only other team to dare holding two in reserve, also qualifying with the fourth fastest time.  The last five teams, two qualifying exclusively on time, were within .09 of each other.

For the final, USA brought in the big guns, all four were individual Olympic Gold Medalists but none had won the Olympic 400 m, only Allyson Felix had even entered it.  Leading off on her 22nd birthday, newly crowned Olympic 400 hurdles champion and world record holder Sydney McLaughlin made up the 3 turn stagger distance on Belgium's Naomi Van Den Broeck in the first 200 metres.  Through the second turn. only Jamaica's Roneisha McGregor seemed to be tracking McLaughlin.  McGregor struggled the final 100, Poland's fresh Natalia Kaczmarek passing her to exchange second.  McLaughlin's split out of the blocks, 50.21.  Already the most decorated female track athlete in Olympic history, Felix took USA through to a 5-metre lead at the break line with veterans Iga Baumgart-Witan (POL) and Janieve Russell (JAM) battling down the backstretch in hot pursuit with only Canada on the end of the group separating from the other teams.  Through the turn Baumgart-Witan separated from Russell and closed down to within 3 metres of Felix.  Then reality set in, Baumgart-Witan would  get no closer as Felix opened up the gap on the final straightaway passing to 2016 400 hurdle champion and previous world record holder, Dalilah Muhammad 6 metres ahead.  Felix' split 49.38.  Behind them, Canada 's from Madeline Price to Kyra Constantine got the jump on Jamaica's pass from Russell to 100 bronze medalist Shericka Jackson to take over third.  Seeming to accelerate then accelerate some more, Muhammad opened up two more metres on Poland's Małgorzata Hołub-Kowalik halfway through the lap and adding two more before passing to 800 metre gold medalist Athing Mu.  Muhammad's split 48.94.  Five metres behind Poland, Jackson was able to edge slightly ahead of Constantine at the final handoff.  Through the anchor lap, Mu efficiently put the hammer down, widening the gap with every stride.  By the time Mu crossed the finish line, she was 26 metres ahead of Poland's Justyna Święty-Ersetic, Mu splitting a phenomenal 48.32.  Behind Święty-Ersetic, Canada's Sage Watson managed to get ahead of Jamaica's fresh Candice McLeod, until McLeod came back in the final 100 to take bronze.  It was Watson's second consecutive Olympics to anchor her team to fourth place.

This was USA's seventh consecutive Olympic gold, their 3:16.85 the fifth fastest time in history.  Poland's 3:20.53 became their new National record.  For Felix, it became her eleventh and likely final Olympic medal.

Background
This was the 13th appearance of the event, having appeared at every Olympics since 1972.

Qualification

A National Olympic Committee (NOC) could qualify a relay team of 5 athletes in one of three ways. A total of 16 NOCs qualified.

 The top 8 NOCs at the 2019 World Athletics Championships qualified a relay team.
 The top 8 NOCs at the 2021 World Athletics Relays qualified a relay team.
 Where an NOC placed in the top 8 at both the 2019 World Championships and the 2021 World Relays, the quota place was allocated to the world ranking list as of 29 June 2021. In this case, 4 teams did so, so there are 4 places available through the world rankings.

The qualifying period was originally from 1 May 2019 to 29 June 2020. Due to the COVID-19 pandemic, the period was suspended from 6 April 2020 to 30 November 2020, with the end date extended to 29 June 2021. The qualifying time standards could be obtained in various meets during the given period that have the approval of the IAAF. Both indoor and outdoor meets are eligible. The most recent Area Championships may be counted in the ranking, even if not during the qualifying period.

Competition format
The event continued to use the two-round format introduced in 2012.

Records
Prior to this competition, the existing world, Olympic, and area records were as follows.

Schedule
All times are Japan Standard Time (UTC+9)

The women's 4 × 400 metres relay took place over two separate days.

Results

Heats
Qualification Rules: First 3 in each heat (Q) and the next 2 fastest (q) advance to the Final

Heat 1

Heat 2

Final

References

Women's 4 x 400 metres relay
Olympics 2020
Women's events at the 2020 Summer Olympics
Olympics